Pseudafreutreta fatua is a species of tephritid or fruit flies in the genus Pseudafreutreta of the family Tephritidae.

Distribution
Ghana, Nigeria, Cameroon.

References

Tephritinae
Insects described in 1942
Diptera of Africa